A rice-fish system is a polyculture practice that integrates rice agriculture with aquaculture, most commonly with freshwater fish. This practice is highly valued as it was one of the first to be considered as a “Globally Important Agricultural Heritage System” according to FAO-GEF (Global Environment Facility). It is based on a mutually beneficial symbiotic relationship between rice and fish that is developed when introduced into the same ecosystem. Many benefits, including social, economic and environmental come with these systems.

History
Cultivating rice and fish simultaneously is a practice thought to be over 2,000 years old. Ancient clay models of rice fields containing miniature pieces, and more specifically miniature pieces of fish such as the common carp, have been found in China. They were found in tombs dating from the ancient Han dynasty (206 BC – 220 AD).  Even though the exact location of the first rice-fish systems is unknown, it is believed that the system originated somewhere in continental Asia in countries such as India, Thailand, northern Vietnam and southern China. The most common theory is that the process started in China since they are considered precursors of aquaculture with heavily developed systems for the time.

Archaeological researches have found that the common carps were probably one of the first fish used in rice-fish systems. Wei dynasty records dating from 220 to 265 AD mention “a small fish with yellow scales and a red tail, grown in the rice fields of Pi County northeast of Chengdu, Sichuan Province, can be used for making sauce”. Liu Xun wrote the first descriptions of the system, with texts written during 900 AD during the Tang dynasty.  Rice-fish systems may have evolved from pond culture in China, with one theory stating that the practice started when farmers decided to place excess fry in their ponds. After observing the improved growth of fish when placed in rice fields instead of ponds, farmers took to the habit of raising their fish in rice fields, which would later lead to the rice-fish system.

In other countries, it is possible that the practice has developed independently from China. Research has estimated that it spread from India to other neighbouring Asian countries over 1500 years ago. The practice slowly gained popularity among the farmers and by the mid-1900s, over 28 countries spread on 6 continents, used rice-fish systems. The continents include Africa, Asia, Australia, Europe, North America and South America. Historically, the common carp and the Mozambique tilapia (Oreochromis mossambicus) were the most commonly grown fish. However, as the practice spread throughout the world, new species were introduced and local fish was now also used in rice fields. For example, Malaysia introduced the snakeskin gourami (Trichogaster pectoralis) and Egypt uses the Nile tilapia (Oreochromis niloticus).

One of the earliest researches was conducted in 1935 to analyse whether the system was beneficial. The research took place in the Songjian (Jiangsu Province) and studied the effect of growing black carp (Mylopharyngodon piceus), grass carp, silver carp, bighead carp (Aristichthys nobilis) and the common carp: the results were satisfactory.

Until the 1980s, the rice-fish systems were low maintenance since the main appeal was the optimization of space and the possibility to grow additional animal protein together with rice as a staple food. The need to optimize the space was further emphasized by a growing population in various countries. However, from the 1980s on, the system developed rapidly with new species being included such as the Chinese mitten crab (Eriocheir sinensis), the red swamp crayfish (Procambarus clarkia) and softshell turtles only to name a few.

Principle
Rice-fish systems are based upon the Rice-Fish Symbiosis theory. Both rice (a semiaquatic wetland crop) and fish are grown in the same aquatic ecosystem and both benefit from this, creating a mutualistic relationship. The principle has evolved through the years and major technological advances allowed for the popularisation of the practice. A notable improvement was the addition of channels in the previously flat rice fields that allowed for the fish to continue growing even during rice harvest and dry seasons. This was coupled with the introduction of fences.

Before creating the rice field,  of organic manure is applied per 667 m2. Doing this provides nutrients for rice and the added cultures of plankton and benthos that are used to feed the fish. During the main growing season, supplementary feeds complement the plankton and benthos culture and are used once or twice a day. The supplementary feeds include fish meal, soybean cake, rice bran and wheat bran. Fish is stocked at a rate between 0.25 and 1 fish per m2.

Unwanted fish or invasive species can threaten the symbiotic relationship between rice and fish and therefore threaten the food production. For example, in the integrated Rice-Swamp Loach Aquaculture Model, catfish, snakeheads (Channa argus) and paddy eels (Monopterus albus) are considered as unwanted species.  Predatory birds can also be considered a threat: adding nets to the rice fields can prevent these birds from eating the wanted fish.

Rice-fish systems are only one type of integrated rice-field system: 19 other models exist, for example rice-crayfish, rice-crab and rice-turtle.

Rice-fish symbiotic relation
Rice and fish form a mutualistic symbiosis — in other words, they both benefit from growing in the same ecosystem. The rice provides the fish with a shelter as well as providing shade and, in turn, reducing water temperature, which creates a more suitable environment. Rice plantations decrease the concentrations of ammonia in the water as well as the total nitrogen present in the soil, contributing also to the improvement of environmental conditions. Fish also benefit from the herbivorous insects that can be found on the rice by having a supplementary food source.

On the other hand, the fish reduce insect, pests, diseases and weeds. The pests include brown planthoppers and a notable disease that can be prevented by the addition of fish is the rice sheath blight. By controlling weeds, the competition for nutrients is decreased between rice and weeds and therefore, more nutrients are available for the rice, which has a positive effect on nutrient uptake. The CO2 release due to the presence of the fish might also have a positive effect on the rice by using it in photosynthesis.

The constant fish movements allow for the loosening of the surface soil which can:

 Improve oxygen levels by increasing the amount of dissolved oxygen. Consequently, the activity of microorganisms is increased and they generate more usable nutrients, which will allow an increased nutrient uptake for the rice.
 Increase mineralization of the organic matter.
 Optimization of nutrient release in the soil. 
 Promote fertilizer decomposition and therefore fertilizer effectiveness. 
 Better root development of the rice.

Soil fertility is also highly affected by the integration of fish: fish manure is considered an organic fertilizer, meaning higher concentrations in soil organic matter. Water and soil fertility were also affected by the increase in nitrogen, phosphorus and potassium. The symbiosis presents an effective nutrient recycling. Overall, the inclusion of fish in rice-fields allows for a sustained soil health, organism biodiversity, productivity and production sustainability.

The aquatic diversity found in rice-fish systems also includes plankton (both phytoplankton and zooplankton), soil benthic fauna and microbial populations that all play a role in the enhanced soil fertility and the sustainability of production. However, benthic communities may be disturbed by the constant grazing from the fish.

Benefits

Economic
The net return percentages vary between countries and within countries. Overall integrated rice-fish fields do have a positive impact on net returns. In Bangladesh, the net returns are over 50% greater than in normal rice monocultures. In China, according to the studied region, the net return can be between 45 and 270% greater than that of monocultures of rice. A case of loss in net returns was found in Thailand with only 80% profitability compared to rice monocultures. This might be caused by the need to invest when starting the system. Indeed, starting rice-fish systems seems to be less common in poorer countries due to the need for high economic inputs at the start and consequently creates an obstacle to the implementation of rice-fish systems in these areas.

Farmers
Rice-fish systems also have a positive impact on farmers, as it seems that there is a decrease in manual labour since fish act as weed and pest controllers as well as fertilizers. On the other hand, this might be undermined by the need to prepare the fields for fish stocking and fish harvesting which leads to an increased labour. The farmer's income is also impacted by the integrated rice cultures, with an estimated increase of over 23%. Moreover, a series of studies show that it also benefits the farmer's diet by integrating fish protein.

Productivity and profitability
The use of rice-fish systems has resulted in an increase in rice yields and in turn in productivity. Studies have shown that it allowed the increase from 6.7 tons to 7.5 tons of rice per hectare and simultaneously also from 0.75 tons to 2.25 tons of fish per hectare. The productivity is enhanced by the nutrient recycling created by the fish.

Space is also optimized, as two food sources are cultivated in the same area. This, in turn, would augment the profitability of a specific terrain.

Tourism
The landscapes created by rice-fish systems have also been seen as a possible tourist attraction as it creates a distinctive landscape.

Public Health
In 1981, the Health Commission of China recognised integrated rice fields as a possible measure to decrease the population of mosquitoes, which carry diseases such as malaria and dengue fever. Studies have shown that the larvae density is lesser in integrated rice fields since freshwater fishes routinely prey on the larvae. In fact, cases of malaria drastically decreased in a highly endemic area, going from 16.5% to 0.2% cases in only five years 

It is also believed that rice-fish systems might decrease the number of snails, known to carry trematodes that can cause in turn schistosomiasis.

The reduced use of pesticides due to both the need to safeguard the fish's health and the fish acting as pest-controllers might also be considered as an improvement in health since agricultural chemicals can be carcinogenic and toxic.

Environmental
As fish allow pest-control and weed-control, fewer chemicals (such as pesticides and herbicides) are used, which benefits the environment as it lessens the impact of agricultural chemicals. In turn, biodiversity is increased.

Rice-fish systems can reduce methane emissions compared to rice farming alone.

Applications

Developing countries
Rice-field systems are being exported to less developed countries with the FAO (Food and Agriculture Organization of the United Nations)/ China Trust fund. About 80 Chinese rice-field experts were sent to underdeveloped countries in diverse regions of the world such as certain African countries, other parts of Asia and in the South Pacific to implement the rice-fish systems and their benefits as well as share their agriculture knowledge. For example, the China-Nigeria South-South Cooperation programme integrated over 10,000 hectares of rice-fish fields in Nigeria, which has allowed for the production of rice and tilapia to almost double.

Climate change
Climate change is known to be a threat to global food production by creating heavy rainfall and extreme weather conditions. These changes may cause outbreaks of pests with, for example, an increase in the number of pest hoppers and stem borers. Research has been conducted to determine whether rice-fish systems will be beneficial in future climates affected by the rise in temperatures. The integrated rice systems have the highest reliability and stability indexes and therefore seem better adapted to future changes than the traditional rice monoculture. Rice-fish systems are promising models for the coming environmental changes and challenges which will reduce risks for smallholders and maintain productivity and stability.

References

Fish farming
Rice production